Physalaemus henselii is a species of frog in the family Leptodactylidae.
It is found in Argentina, Brazil, and Uruguay.
Its natural habitats are subtropical or tropical seasonally wet or flooded lowland grassland, intermittent freshwater marshes, pastureland, rural gardens, and urban areas.
It is threatened by habitat loss.

References

henselii
Taxonomy articles created by Polbot
Amphibians described in 1872
Taxa named by Wilhelm Peters